A list of Spanish-produced and co-produced feature films released in Spain in 1988.

Films

See also 
 3rd Goya Awards

References

External links
 Spanish films of 1988 at the Internet Movie Database

1988
Spanish
Films